Pinal is a census-designated place (CDP) in Gila County, Arizona, United States. The population was 439 at the 2010 census.

Geography
The CDP is located in southern Gila County southeast of the center of Globe, the county seat. The CDP is bordered by the Globe city limits to the north, east, and south.

Demographics

References

Census-designated places in Gila County, Arizona